Spodnja Idrija (in older sources also Idrija pri Fari) is a settlement on the right bank of the Idrijca River in the Municipality of Idrija in the traditional Inner Carniola region of Slovenia.

Name
The name Spodnja Idrija means 'lower Idrija'. This distinguished the town from Idrija, which lies upriver and about  higher in elevation, and which was formerly known as Zgornja Idrija 'upper Idrija'.

Church
The parish church in the settlement is dedicated to the Assumption of Mary and belongs to the Koper Diocese. It is locally known as the Church of Mary on the Rock. A chapel is mentioned on the site in written sources from 1132. The church was built in the 15th century and rebuilt around 1674 in the Baroque style.

References

External links
Spodnja Idrija on Geopedia

Populated places in the Municipality of Idrija